Glen Cairn is a rural locality in the Lockyer Valley Region, Queensland, Australia.

Geography 
The eastern part of the locality is lower flatter land mostly cleared for irrigated seasonal horticulture. The western part of the locality is hillier and has more natural bushland; it is predominantly used for grazing on native vegetation.

History 
The Ropeley East State school building was relocated to Glen Cairn in early 1926. Glen Cairn State School opened on 4 October 1926. It closed on 1972. It was on Glen Cairn Road (approx ).

Education 
There are no schools in Glen Cairn. The nearest government primary schools are Forest Hill State School in neighbouring Forest Hill to the north-east, Blenheim State School in neighbouring Blenheim to the south, and Gatton State School in neighbouring Gatton to the north-west. The nearest government secondary schools are Laidley State High School in Laidley to the east and Lockyer District State High School in Gatton to the north-west.

References 

Lockyer Valley Region
Localities in Queensland